Carlos Genaro Muñiz (born June 25, 1969) is the chief justice on the Florida Supreme Court. He was appointed by Governor Ron DeSantis on January 22, 2019. Previously, he was General Counsel of the United States Department of Education.

Early life and education 

Muñiz graduated from Bishop Ireton High School in Alexandria, Virginia in 1987, and received his Bachelor of Arts from the University of Virginia in 1991.

From 1991 to 1994, Muñiz was a civil rights analyst at the United States Department of Justice. In 1994, he enrolled at Yale Law School, receiving his Juris Doctor in 1997.

Career 

After graduating from law school, Muñiz clerked for Judge Thomas Aquinas Flannery of the United States District Court for the District of Columbia, from 1997 to 1998, and for Judge José A. Cabranes of the United States Court of Appeals for the Second Circuit, from 1998 to 1999. He then became an associate at Hogan & Hartson in Washington, D.C.

In January 2001, Muñiz moved to Florida to become deputy general counsel for Governor Jeb Bush. He left that position in June 2003, moving to the law firm of Gray Robinson. He rejoined the Bush administration in April 2005 as general counsel of the Florida Department of Financial Services, leaving that position in November 2006.

Beginning in December 2006, Muñiz was the policy director of the Republican Party of Florida; in July 2007, he became the deputy chief of staff and counsel in the office of the Speaker of the Florida House of Representatives, leaving in October 2009. He was managing director at Bancroft Associates, in Washington, D.C., from October 2009 to April 2010, then returned to GrayRobinson.

In January 2011, Muñiz became deputy attorney general and chief of staff to Florida Attorney General Pam Bondi. In 2013, he was involved in the discussions with Bondi that led her to take no action on consumer complaints against Trump University.

In January 2014, Muñiz left Bondi's office to join the firm of McGuireWoods, as a partner and lawyer in their Jacksonville office and as a senior vice president of the firm's consulting business in Tallahassee. At that firm, he represented Florida State University against a lawsuit brought by a student who accused quarterback Jameis Winston of raping her. The U.S. Department of Education's Office for Civil Rights investigated the case.

In March 2017, Muñiz was nominated by President Donald Trump to become the General Counsel of the United States Department of Education. He became a senior advisor in the Office of Secretary of the department in February 2018, and was confirmed as General Counsel by the U.S. Senate in April 2018, by a vote of 55–43.

On January 22, 2019, Governor Ron DeSantis appointed Muñiz to the Supreme Court of Florida.

On September 9, 2020, President Trump included him on a list of potential nominees to the Supreme Court.

Publications 
Muñiz has written two articles for the James Madison Institute: "Parental Notification of a Minor's Termination of Pregnancy" (published Fall 2004); and "It's Time to Fight Judicial Imperialism" (published August 17, 2005).

Personal 
Muñiz married his wife, Kathleen Baur Muñiz, in 2001. The couple has three children.

See also 
 Donald Trump Supreme Court candidates

References 

|-

|-

1969 births
Living people
20th-century American lawyers
21st-century American lawyers
21st-century American judges
Chief Justices of the Florida Supreme Court
Federalist Society members
Florida lawyers
Florida Republicans
Justices of the Florida Supreme Court
Hispanic and Latino American judges
Hispanic and Latino American people in Florida politics
Lawyers from Chicago
Lawyers from Washington, D.C.
McGuireWoods people
People associated with Hogan Lovells
Trump administration personnel
United States Department of Education officials
University of Virginia alumni
Yale Law School alumni